Pindale  is a village in the Wundwin Township, Mandalay Division of central  Myanmar.

See also
 Pindale Min

References

Populated places in Mandalay District